Nightalk is a 2022 Canadian thriller drama film, directed by Donald Shebib. It stars Ashley Bryant as Brenda, a police officer investigating the murder of a young woman; after learning that the woman was active on an online dating application called Nightalk, she joins the application under cover only to be drawn into a relationship with Tom (Al Mukadam), the primary suspect.

The cast also includes Ted Hallett, Art Hindle, Emily Andrews, Rena Polley, Kent Sheridan, Stefano DiMatteo, Martin Doyle, Jim Codrington, William Poulin, Brian Bisson, Jennifer Hui, Eric Fink, Samantha Swan, Lina Yakovlieva, Jen Pogue and Emily Summers.

It is Shebib's first new film since Down the Road Again in 2011. Shebib's son, Noah "40" Shebib, is an executive producer.

The film premiered in the Contemporary World Cinema program at the 2022 Toronto International Film Festival on September 16, 2022.

References

External links

2022 films
2022 thriller films
Canadian thriller drama films
Films directed by Donald Shebib
Films shot in Ontario
English-language Canadian films
2020s English-language films
2020s Canadian films